Joseph John "Bo" Orlando (born April 3, 1966) is a former American football safety. He played college football at West Virginia. He was drafted in the sixth round (157th overall) of the 1989 NFL draft by the Houston Oilers.

In his career, he also played for the San Diego Chargers, Cincinnati Bengals, and Pittsburgh Steelers.

High school career
Orlando played quarterback and defensive back at Berwick High School in Pennsylvania. He led his team to a 13–0 season during his senior year and a #1 ranking on the USA Today Top 25 in 1983.

College career
Orlando played quarterback in high school, but when the West Virginia Mountaineers recruited him, they moved him to strong-safety. He helped lead the Mountaineers to their undefeated 1988 season, and is one of the greatest defensive backs to play for West Virginia University. In 1987 against East Carolina, Orlando had an interception that he returned 67 yards for a touchdown, which is the fifth longest interception return in school history.

Professional career
Orlando was selected 157th overall, sixth round in the 1989 NFL Draft by the Houston Oilers. He played five seasons with the Oilers, into 1994, recording seven interceptions and returning one for a touchdown. He then played one season with the Chargers, two with the Bengals, and his last season in 1998 with the Steelers.

Orlando totaled two sacks and ten interceptions in his career.

Personal life
As of 2012, Orlando is involved with a startup sports clothing apparel company. He is also an assistant coach at his son's high school in Bethlehem, Pennsylvania. Recently, in 2019, Orlando became Athletic Director of his Alma mater, Berwick Area Senior High School.

References

1966 births
Living people
People from Berwick, Pennsylvania
American football safeties
American football cornerbacks
Houston Oilers players
Cincinnati Bengals players
Pittsburgh Steelers players
San Diego Chargers players
West Virginia Mountaineers football players
Players of American football from Pennsylvania